Frank Allen,  (1874 – 19 November 1965) was a Canadian academic and physicist, specializing in physiological optics.

Biography
Born in New Brunswick, Frank Allen received his bachelor's degree in 1895 from the University of New Brunswick with highest honours in physics and chemistry and then his M.A. there in 1897. In 1902 he received his PhD in physics from Cornell University with a thesis on physiological optics. In 1904 Allen accepted the founding chair of the physics department at the University of Manitoba, serving as the head of the physics department until his retirement in 1944. In his career he published about 60 scientific papers, most of which concerned physiological optics and the physics of the other mammalian senses. He was also the author of two critically acclaimed books, The Universe, from Crystal Spheres to Relativity (1931) and Responses of the Organism to Stimulation (1971). In 1912, he was made a Fellow of the Royal Society of Canada. He was awarded the Society's Henry Marshall Tory Medal in 1944.

Legacy
Frank Allen and his wife had a daughter, the artist Lillian B. Allen, and two sons, one of whom was John Frank Allen, a noted low-temperature physicist. The Allen Building on the University of Manitoba's Fort Garry Campus is named in honour of Frank Allen.

References

1874 births
1965 deaths
Canadian physicists
Cornell University alumni
Fellows of the Royal Society of Canada
Academic staff of the University of Manitoba
University of New Brunswick alumni